Home Farm Twins is a series of children's books written by Jenny Oldfield. The books were later successfully adapted into a television series for the BBC, with Polly Duniam and Sophie Duniam cast as the twins. The television series proved so popular that the books were re-packaged as TV tie-ins.

The books
 Speckle the Stray
 Sinbad the Runaway
 Solo the Homeless
 Susie the Orphan
 Spike the Tramp
 Snip and Snap the Truants
 Sunny the Hero
 Socks the Survivor
 Stevie the Rebel
 Samson the Giant
 Sultan the Patient
 Sorrel the Substitute
 Skye the Champion
 Sugar and Spice the Pickpockets
 Sophie the Show-Off
 Silky the Foundling
 Scott the Braveheart
 Spot the Prisoner
 Shelley the Shadow
 Star the Surprise

Specials
Scruffy the Scamp
Stanley the Troublemaker
Smokey the Mystery
Stalky the Mascot
Samantha the Snob

At Stonelea
Mitch goes Missing
Maisea wants her Mum
Mac Climbs a Mountain

Television series
The television series ran for three seasons from 7 January 1999 until 30 March 2000 with repeats of the three seasons shown in 2001.

Home Farm Twins follows the adventures of twins Hannah and Helen around the local countryside in this series dramatized by Elly Brewer from the Home Farm books by Jenny Oldfield.

The first season started with the Moore family moving from London to the country village of Doveton. Hannah is a dreamer and an idealist, much more 'girly' than her tomboy sister Helen, who is more outspoken, daring and sarcastic.

The girls quickly got to know the locals and began a long-term friendship with Sam from Crackpot Farm who teased them for being 'townies' but still loved to join in their adventures but Sam had dreams elsewhere and dropped a bombshell on the twins during Season 3 by announcing he was to leave Doveton.

The twins' mother, Mary, is famous for making cakes at the Curlew Cafe which is the business she started up after moving to Doveton, while her husband, David, is a wildlife photographer and studies animals. The twins' parents had a baby girl during Season 3. The girls learned that animals were no longer the only ones who needed looking after and promptly watched their baby sister on numerous occasions, getting into big trouble for regular accidents involving their methods. The final season broadcast on the BBC ended with the twins facing the realities of growing up and looking back at their time spent living on Home Farm and wondering what life had in store for them next.

Television series cast
 Polly Duniam as Hannah Moore
 Sophie Duniam as Helen Moore
 Jacquetta May as Mary Moore
 Martin Ball as David Moore
 Ben Evans as Sam

References

External links

 

1999 British television series debuts
2000 British television series endings
1990s British children's television series
2000s British children's television series
Series of children's books
British children's novels
BBC children's television shows
English-language television shows